Too Rude is the debut album for the reggae punk band, Too Rude. It is also the first album the vocalist Dogboy recorded. The album was released April 4, 2000, on Suburban Noize Records. It was recorded as a traditional reggae record with a punky twist.

Track listing

References

External links
Myspace
Suburban Noize

2000 debut albums
Suburban Noize Records albums